Redding Center is a census-designated place (CDP) in the town of Redding, Fairfield County, Connecticut, United States, comprising the central village in the town. Connecticut Route 107 passes through the community, leading north toward Bethel and southwest toward Georgetown. The Redding Center Historic District is at the center of the CDP, around the intersections of Cross Highway, Sanfordtown Road, Lonetown Road, and Hill Road.

Redding Center was first listed as a CDP prior to the 2020 census.

References 

Census-designated places in Fairfield County, Connecticut
Census-designated places in Connecticut